Anđelko Kvesić (born 21 February 1969) is a retired Bosnian football midfielder.

References

1969 births
Living people
Association football midfielders
Yugoslav footballers
Bosnia and Herzegovina footballers
FK Velež Mostar players
NK Zagreb players
NK Inter Zaprešić players
HNK Segesta players
K.V.C. Westerlo players
HŠK Zrinjski Mostar players
NK Kamen Ingrad players
Croatian Football League players
Belgian Pro League players
Premier League of Bosnia and Herzegovina players
First Football League (Croatia) players
Bosnia and Herzegovina expatriate footballers
Expatriate footballers in Croatia
Bosnia and Herzegovina expatriate sportspeople in Croatia
Expatriate footballers in Belgium
Bosnia and Herzegovina expatriate sportspeople in Belgium